Rune Källqvist (4 November 1929 – 3 March 1994) was a Swedish water polo player. He competed in the men's tournament at the 1952 Summer Olympics.

See also
 Sweden men's Olympic water polo team records and statistics
 List of men's Olympic water polo tournament goalkeepers

References

External links
 

1929 births
1994 deaths
People from Borås Municipality
Swedish male water polo players
Water polo goalkeepers
Olympic water polo players of Sweden
Water polo players at the 1952 Summer Olympics
Sportspeople from Västra Götaland County